= José Angelino Caamal =

Mexican politician

- Born: 14 February 1961 (age 65); Campeche, Campeche, Mexico
- Occupation: Deputy
- Political party: PANAL

José Angelino Caamal Mena (born 14 February 1961) is a Mexican politician affiliated with the PANAL. As of 2013 he served as Deputy of the LXII Legislature of the Mexican Congress representing Campeche.
